Melvin "Mel" Lister (born August 29, 1977, in New York City, New York) is an American long jumper and triple jumper.

He finished fifth in long jump at the 2001 World Indoor Championships. He also competed at the 2000 and 2004 Olympic Games without reaching the final.

His personal best long jump is 8.49 metres, achieved in May 2000 in Baton Rouge. His personal best triple jump is 17.78 metres, achieved in July 2004 in Sacramento. He also had 20.51 seconds in the 200 metres.

Lister competed collegiately at track and field powerhouse University of Arkansas.

References 
 

1977 births
Living people
American male triple jumpers
American male long jumpers
Athletes (track and field) at the 2000 Summer Olympics
Athletes (track and field) at the 2003 Pan American Games
Athletes (track and field) at the 2004 Summer Olympics
Olympic track and field athletes of the United States
University of Arkansas alumni
Arkansas Razorbacks men's track and field athletes
Pan American Games track and field athletes for the United States
Track and field athletes from New York City